Lyman Burt Peet (March 1, 1809 - January 11, 1878; Chinese: 弼利民 or 弼來滿; Pinyin: Bì Lìmín or Bì Láimǎn; Foochow Romanized: Bĭk Lé-mìng or Bĭk Lài-muāng) was one of the first Congregationalist missionaries to Fuzhou, China.

Life
Lyman Burt Peet was born on March 1, 1809, in Cornwall, Vermont to Lemuel and Roxalany (Stebbins) Peet. He graduated from Middlebury College in 1834 and from Andover Theological Seminary in 1837. On December 13, 1837, he was ordained in South Dennis, Massachusetts, and sailed as a missionary of the A.B.C.F.M. for Siam on July 6, 1839. In August 1846 he was transferred to Fuzhou and reached there in September 1847. Peet retired in 1871, and resided in West Haven, Connecticut until he died of dysentery on January 11, 1878.

Peet married twice. In 1839 he married his first wife, Rebecca Clemence Sherrill, who died in Fuzhou in 1856. On June 6, 1858, he married Hannah Louisa Plimpton, who, after Peet's death, married to another ABCFM missionary in Fuzhou, Charles Hartwell.

During his years in Fuzhou, he helped translate several portions of the Bible including the Book of Psalms, the Proverbs, and the Book of Job into the local Fuzhou dialect.

References

Presbyterian missionaries in China
Christian missionaries in Fujian
Protestant writers
Middlebury College alumni
Andover Theological Seminary alumni
People from Cornwall, Vermont
1809 births
1878 deaths
American expatriates in China
American Presbyterian missionaries